Pirabad is a village in Lorestan Province, Iran.

Pirabad may also refer to:
Pirabad, Narmashir, Kerman Province
Pirabad, Rigan, Kerman Province
Pirabad, Khuzestan